Papilio euphranor, the forest swallowtail or bush kite, is a butterfly of the family Papilionidae. It is found in southern Africa.

The wingspan is 80–100 mm in males and 90–110 mm in females. It has two flight periods from January to April and September to December.

The larvae feed on Cryptocarya woodii.

Taxonomy
Papilio euphranor is a member of the hesperus species group. The members of the clade are:
Papilio hesperus Westwood, 1843
Papilio euphranor Trimen, 1868
Papilio horribilis Butler, 1874
Papilio pelodurus Butler, 1896

References

Butterflies described in 1868
euphranor
Butterflies of Africa
Taxa named by Roland Trimen